Ciaran Clark (born 26 September 1989) is a professional footballer who plays as a central defender, central midfielder and left-back for Championship club Sheffield United, on loan from Premier League club Newcastle United and the Republic of Ireland national team. Clark is a product of the Aston Villa Academy and made 159 appearances for their senior side before transferring to Newcastle in 2016.

Clark captained England at under-18, under-19 and under-20 level, but in October 2010 declared his ambition to play for the Republic of Ireland, the country of his parents' birth. He was called up to the national team a month later for the friendly match against Norway, and made his full debut against Wales on 8 February 2011.

Club career

Aston Villa

Early career
Clark was born in Harrow, London, and grew up in Sandy, Bedfordshire. He came through the Aston Villa youth academy after joining at the age of eleven, and captained the academy U18 team to the 2007–08 Premier Academy League—the academy's maiden league title. He was given a squad number for the 2008–09 season and named on the bench for Villa's 2008–09 UEFA Cup match away at CSKA Moscow, but remained an unused substitute. He captained the reserves to the Premier Reserve League South title and defeated PRL North winners Sunderland in the play-off final to win their first ever Reserve League trophy.

2009–10 season
Clark was included in the squads for the pre-season friendlies and the 2009 Peace Cup. On 30 August 2009, he made his debut in a 2–0 win against Fulham. With Curtis Davies unavailable through injury, the 19-year-old was named in Villa's starting line-up, partnering Carlos Cuéllar in defence. He helped keep a clean sheet and nearly marked his debut with a goal but sent his header inches wide. Garth Crooks of the BBC named the youngster in his team of the week. Although the formidable partnership of new signings James Collins and Richard Dunne limited him to the bench, he was tipped to break into the first team on a regular basis within several years. In November 2009, he signed a contract extension until June 2012.

2010–11 season
Clark started in the first two league games of the 2010–11 season: against West Ham United, partnering Richard Dunne and keeping a clean sheet; then against Newcastle United. Clark was also handed a start in Gérard Houllier's first match as new Villa manager, against Blackburn Rovers in the League Cup. He then started the match against local rivals Birmingham City in midfield and continued in the role against Fulham and Blackpool due to the club's injury crisis. On 27 November 2010, Clark scored his first two goals for the club in a 4–2 defeat against Arsenal at home. He scored a 91st-minute equaliser against Chelsea on 2 January 2011 to rescue a point. He also became the only player in Premier League history to be booked in six successive appearances within the same season.

2011–12 season
Clark scored his first FA Cup goal for the club against Bristol Rovers on 29 January 2012, with a solo run, including stepovers and a left-footed strike curled into the bottom corner.

2012–13 season

On 25 August 2012, he was sent off against Everton for a professional foul on Nikica Jelavić. On 3 September 2012, he scored his first goal of the season in a 1–1 draw away to Newcastle United. On 8 December 2012, after captaining Villa's youth and reserve sides, Clark was handed the armband for the senior side for the first time in a 0–0 draw at home to Stoke, after Gabriel Agbonlahor who had started the match as captain was replaced by Darren Bent. Three days later, Clark followed up his initial role as captain by performing the role again, this time for the full 90 minutes, in a 4–1 victory in the League Cup away at Norwich which saw Villa qualify for the semi-finals.

2013–14 season
Clark started Aston Villa's first game in their 3–1 away victory at Arsenal. After a dip in his form midway through Aston Villa's season, he was dropped to the bench as Lambert preferred a partnership between Ron Vlaar and fellow academy graduate, Nathan Baker. However, due to injury constantly plaguing Aston Villa's defence, along with consistently poor results, Clark still managed 28 appearances in a season that saw Villa finish 15th on 38 points. He accumulated nine yellow cards throughout the season.

In January 2014 during a training game Clark broke the right leg of his team-mate Libor Kozák. The mishandled injury virtually ended Kozák's Premier League career.

2014–15 season
Aston Villa began the 2014–15 season in good form with Paul Lambert re-introducing Alan Hutton, forming a new look back four of Alan Hutton, Ron Vlaar, Philippe Senderos and Aly Cissokho. When an injury ruled Vlaar out, Nathan Baker came into the back four, with Clark remaining on the bench. After injuries to both Baker and Senderos, Clark was called on along with Jores Okore and formed a solid partnership. Clark scored his first goal of the season from a free-kick curled in by Ashley Westwood in a 2–1 home victory over Leicester.

Newcastle United

On 3 August 2016, Newcastle announced that they had completed the signing of Clark. Having established himself alongside club captain Jamaal Lascelles in central defence, he scored his first goal for the club in a 6–0 win against Queens Park Rangers on 13 September 2016. He went on to add further goals against Brentford and Bristol City while also helping Newcastle concede the joint-lowest number of goals in the division as they returned to the Premier League at the first time of asking. He remained a regular starter for Newcastle in league games for the first half of the following season. However, he was left out of the side for most of the second half of the season with Florian Lejeune and Jamaal Lascelles being preferred at central defence. In the 2018–19 season he only managed 8 appearances in the first team in the Premier League; however he still managed to score three goals, against Arsenal, Burnley, and Chelsea respectively.

In November 2019 he said he had previously considered leaving Newcastle United in order to maintain his place in the Irish international set-up.

On 20 January 2021, Clark extended his contract with Newcastle, signing a new two-and-a-half-year contract.

Loan to Sheffield United 
On 13 July 2022, Clark joined Championship club Sheffield United on loan for the 2022–23 season. He scored his first goal for the club in a 3-1 win over Coventry City on 26 December 2022.

International career

England
Clark captained the England U19 team through qualification for the 2008 UEFA European Under-19 Championship, playing in five out of the six qualifiers and scoring a goal. He missed out on the tournament through an ankle injury sustained during training. After being promoted to the England U20s, he was appointed captain and scored in only his second match, in a friendly against Italy in March 2008.

Republic of Ireland

In late September 2010, Football Association of Ireland (FAI) officials approached Clark about switching his allegiance. They sent scout and former Republic of Ireland under-21 manager, Don Givens, to watch him in the match against Blackburn. On 5 October 2010, it was reported that Clark had pledged his international future to the Irish national team as he qualified through his Irish parents. Club teammate Richard Dunne played a role in convincing him and had spoken to FAI scouts about his eligibility. On 12 November 2010, Clark was named in the Republic of Ireland squad for the friendly against Norway. He then made his debut on 8 February 2011 against Wales at the Aviva Stadium. On 6 February 2013, Clark scored his first goal for the Republic of Ireland, helping them to a 2–0 friendly victory against Poland.

In Republic of Ireland's opening match at Euro 2016 against Sweden, Clark deflected a ball from Zlatan Ibrahimović into his own net to level the scores. Wes Hoolahan had earlier given Ireland the lead but Clark's mishap saw them share the spoils as the match ended 1–1.

In November 2019, he said he had previously considered leaving Newcastle United in order to maintain his place in the Irish international set-up.

Career statistics

Club

International

As of match played 18 November 2019. Republic of Ireland score listed first, score column indicates score after each Clark goal.

Honours
Newcastle United
EFL Championship: 2016–17

Republic of Ireland
Nations Cup: 2011

See also
List of Republic of Ireland international footballers born outside the Republic of Ireland

References

External links

Profile at the Newcastle United F.C. website

1989 births
Living people
Footballers from Harrow, London
People from Sandy, Bedfordshire
Footballers from Bedfordshire
English footballers
England youth international footballers
Republic of Ireland association footballers
Republic of Ireland international footballers
Association football defenders
Aston Villa F.C. players
Newcastle United F.C. players
Premier League players
English Football League players
UEFA Euro 2016 players
English people of Irish descent